USS Honolulu (CL-48) of the United States Navy was a  light cruiser active in the Pacific War (World War II). Honolulu was launched in 1937 and commissioned in 1938. The ship served in the Battle of Tassafaronga, the Battle of Kula Gulf, the Battle of Kolombangara and the Battle of Peleliu. She was taken out of action by serious torpedo damage just before the Battle of Leyte Gulf. She was repaired, but not in time to rejoin the war. She was decommissioned in 1947 and was held in reserve until she was scrapped in 1959.

Inter-war period 
The second Navy ship named for the city of Honolulu, Hawaii, she was launched on 26 August 1937 at the New York Navy Yard, sponsored by Helen Poindexter (the daughter of Joseph B. Poindexter, the Governor of Hawaii), and commissioned on 15 June 1938.

After a shakedown cruise to England, Honolulu engaged in fleet problems and exercises in the Caribbean Sea. She steamed from New York on 24 May 1939 to join the Pacific Fleet, arriving at San Pedro, California, on 14 June. For the remainder of the year, she engaged in exercises along the West Coast. During the first half of 1940, Honolulu continued operations out of Long Beach, California, and after an overhaul at the Puget Sound shipyard, she steamed out of Long Beach Naval Shipyard on 5 November for duty from Pearl Harbor. She operated there through 1941.

World War II 
On December 7, 1941, Honolulu was moored in the Navy Yard when the Imperial Japanese Navy attacked Pearl Harbor. Honolulu suffered only minor hull damage from a near miss from a bomb that exploded under the water.

Following repairs, she sailed on 12 January 1942 to escort a convoy to San Francisco, California, arriving on 21 January. The cruiser continued convoy escort duty to Australia, Samoa, and the United States until late May.

With the Japanese pushing north towards Alaska, Honolulu departed on 29 May to strengthen forces in that area. After two months of continuous operations out of Kodiak, Alaska, she proceeded to Kiska in the Aleutian Islands on 7 August, to begin bombardment of the island. On 21 August, she screened the first American landings in the Aleutians at Adak Island. After shipyard work at the Mare Island Naval Shipyard, Honolulu departed from San Francisco on 3 November 1942, escorting a convoy to Nouméa in the South Pacific. Later that month, Honolulu sailed from Espiritu Santo in the New Hebrides Islands to intercept a Japanese Navy convoy attempting to reinforce their positions on Guadalcanal in the Solomon Islands. The Battle of Tassafaronga began shortly before midnight on 30 November, continuing through the night. One Japanese destroyer was sunk by American cruiser gunfire, but four cruisers were hit by Japanese torpedoes, with one of the cruisers, sinking. Honolulu escaped serious damage in this notable Japanese victory that had very little impact on the fighting on Guadalcanal.

Honolulu operated out of Espiritu Santo in early 1943 with Task Force 67 (TF 67) in an attempt to engage the "Tokyo Express". During May, she engaged in bombardments of New Georgia in the Solomons. Honolulu departed from Espiritu Santo on 28 June for more bombardments in the Solomons. After supporting the landings on New Georgia Island on 4 July, she opened fire on enemy ships in the Battle of Kula Gulf, knocking out one destroyer and assisting in the destruction of others.

The battle-proven cruiser had another opportunity to confront the Japanese fleet on 13 July, in the Battle of Kolombangara. Shortly after midnight, contact was made with an enemy cruiser-destroyer force in "The Slot". After three salvos, the target burst into flames and was soon dead in the water. Honolulu shifted fire to an enemy destroyer, which was immediately hit and disappeared. At 0211, a torpedo struck the starboard side of Honolulu, blowing off her bow. The task force then retired to Tulagi for temporary repairs, and then departed for the large naval base at Pearl Harbor. On 16 August, Honolulu arrived at Pearl Harbor for major repairs. She then proceeded to the shipyard at Mare Island, near San Francisco, for more work.

After the additional repairs at Mare Island, Honolulu departed from San Francisco on 17 November to continue her role in the struggle against Japan. She arrived at Espiritu Santo on 11 December, and then resumed operations in the Solomons later that month. On 27 December, she engaged in the bombardment of an enemy barge, troop, and supply concentration on Bougainville Island. In the early months of 1944, the cruiser continued bombardments and patrols in the Solomon Islands. She screened the landings on Green Island on 13 February, before retiring from the Solomons to begin preparations for the Saipan and Guam operations in the Mariana Islands.

Honolulu took part in bombardments of the southeastern part of Saipan Island in early June as the Navy and Marines leaped across the Pacific. While bombarding Guam in mid-June, Honolulu was deployed northwest to intercept the Japanese fleet. She returned to Eniwetok Atoll on 28 June for replenishments, before providing support for the invasion of Guam. She remained on station for three weeks, performing great service with her accurate gunfire, before returning to Purvis Bay on Florida Island in the Solomons on 18 August. Honolulu steamed out on 6 September to provide fire support for the landings in the Palau Islands, such as at Peleliu Island and Anguar, remaining in this area during September unopposed by the Japanese fleet. America now had decisive command of the sea, and therefore nearly full freedom of operations.

Battle of Leyte 

Honolulu departed from the staging area at Manus Island in the Admiralty Islands on 12 October, and steamed towards the Philippines for the invasion of Leyte. She began a bombardment from Leyte Gulf on 19 October, and the next day she began screening the landings. At 1600, on 20 October an enemy torpedo plane was sighted as it aimed its torpedo at Honolulu. Despite the skillful maneuvering of Captain Thurber to evade, the torpedo found its mark on her port side.

Honolulu sailed out the next day, arriving at Manus on 29 October for temporary repairs, and then steamed for Norfolk, Virginia, on 19 November, arriving on 20 December via Pearl Harbor, San Diego, California, and the Panama Canal. Honolulu remained at Norfolk for the duration of the war, undergoing repairs and alterations which included the installation of four twin 5in/38 gun mounts, and after a shakedown cruise in October 1945, she steamed to Newport, Rhode Island, for duty as a training ship. Honolulu arrived at Philadelphia on 8 January 1946 and was decommissioned there on 3 February 1947, and joined the Reserve Fleet at Philadelphia. Stricken on 1 March 1959, Honolulu was sold for scrapping to Bethlehem Steel, Baltimore, Maryland, on 12 October 1959. Honolulu was scrapped at Sparrow Point, Maryland, on 19 August 1960.

Awards 
Honolulu received eight battle stars for World War II service.
Navy Unit Commendation, for 5-Jul-1943 to 14-Jul-1943 around the time of the Battle of Kula Gulf and the Battle of Kolombangara, 12-Sep-1944 to 20-Oct-1944 around the time of the Battle of Peleliu and Battle of Leyte and 30-Nov-1942, the Battle of Tassafaronga.

See also 
Vice Admiral Robert W. Hayler, commanding officer of Honolulu, August 1942 – March 1944. Received two Navy Crosses during his service with Honolulu.

Footnotes

Notes

Citations

References

External links 

 

Brooklyn-class cruisers
Ships built in Brooklyn
1937 ships
World War II cruisers of the United States
Ships present during the attack on Pearl Harbor
Ships of the Aleutian Islands campaign
Maritime incidents in July 1943